The Lintian Police Substation and Old Lintian Police Station is a former police station in Fenglin Township, Hualien County, Taiwan.

Architecture
The police station consists of two main buildings which was built separately, one during Japanese period and another during Republic of China period.

Transportation
The building is accessible within walking distance northeast of Fenglin Station of Taiwan Railways.

References

Buildings and structures in Hualien County
Former police stations in Taiwan
Tourist attractions in Hualien County